Saint-Amans (Languedocien: Sent Amanç) is a former commune in the Ariège department in south-western France. It was merged, on 1 January 2023, into the commune of Bézac.

Population
Inhabitants are called Saint-Amanois in French.

See also
Communes of the Ariège department

References

Former communes of Ariège (department)
Ariège communes articles needing translation from French Wikipedia